Sunk 500 is the second album by hardcore band LOK, released in 2000.

Track listing
 "Hur många grisar är vi nu?" (How Many Pigs Are We Now?) - 3:07
 "Leksakslandets kungar" (The Kings Of Toy Land) - 3:34
 "Gud ditt svin" (God You Bastard) - 4:57
 "Kompanjoner" (Companions) - 2:24
 "Handflatan" (The Palm Of The Hand) - 2:06
 "Stänkskärmar och sprit" (Mudguards And Booze) - 4:10
 "M som i" (M As In) - 5:23
 "Dakota" - 1:51
 "Bedragaren i Murmansk" (The Deceiver In Murmansk) - 3:20
 "1983" - 1:46
 "Smörjan" (The Filth/The Shit) - 5:14

Credits
 Martin Westerstrand – Vocals
 Thomas Brandt – Guitar
 Daniel Cordero – Bass
 Johan Reivén – Drums

References

2000 albums
LOK (band) albums